Marcel Augusto Ortolan (born 12 November 1981 in Mirassol, São Paulo), commonly known as Marcel, is a Brazilian footballer.

Career
Marcel started his career in Brazilian regional league, playing for Coritiba. After brief spell in Suwon Samsung Bluewings, he joined Académica de Coimbra in January 2005, for US$1.8 million transfer fee. The two seasons spent in Académica de Coimbra were probably the highest point, so far, in Marcel's career: he managed to score 13 goals, saving the club from relegation in the second season and catching the eye of Portuguese big teams such as Benfica and Porto.

He was signed on loan from Benfica on 15 January 2006. Benfica signed the player permanently in the summer of 2006, for €2.66 million fee. However, in December, Marcel was loaned to Braga for one year. Upon his return, Marcel was loaned once more, this time around to the Brazilian side São Paulo for another year. Nevertheless, Marcel was unable to establish himself in the team, hence the loan contract was canceled. Marcel was once again loaned, now to Grêmio where he joined his Benfica teammate Diego Souza.

In 2008, he was loaned to Cruzeiro. He played sparsely, failed to make an impact and his loan was terminated on 13 May. He was loaned again to Grêmio.

He played 29 times for the Campeonato Brasileiro 2008 and score nine goals. On 19 December, Marcel was released from Grêmio and Benfica loaned him for another season, this time for the J1 League side Vissel Kobe.

Rumors around his return to Benfica have started to appear around Portuguese sports journals due to his success in Japan and because of the confirmation that the club's coach Jorge Jesus would bring another striker in January to suppress the shortage of pure centre-forward players on the squad.

In September 2011 he returned to Coritiba, subject to bureaucratic clearance.

Honours

Club
Coritiba
Campeonato Paranaense: 2003, 2012

Suwon Bluewings
K-League: 2004

Santos
Copa do Brasil: 2010

Individual
Campeonato Paranaense Top Scorer: 2003

References

External links

 
 Santos FC Profile

1981 births
Living people
People from Mirassol
Association football forwards
Brazilian footballers
Brazilian expatriate footballers
Coritiba Foot Ball Club players
Suwon Samsung Bluewings players
Associação Académica de Coimbra – O.A.F. players
S.L. Benfica footballers
S.C. Braga players
São Paulo FC players
Grêmio Foot-Ball Porto Alegrense players
Cruzeiro Esporte Clube players
Vissel Kobe players
Santos FC players
CR Vasco da Gama players
Mirassol Futebol Clube players
Criciúma Esporte Clube players
Campeonato Brasileiro Série A players
K League 1 players
Primeira Liga players
J1 League players
Expatriate footballers in South Korea
Expatriate footballers in Portugal
Expatriate footballers in Japan
Brazilian expatriate sportspeople in South Korea
Brazilian expatriate sportspeople in Portugal
Brazilian expatriate sportspeople in Japan
Footballers from São Paulo (state)